R360, R-360, or, variation, may refer to:

 SEGA R360, a motion arcade cabinet and cockpit for videogaming arcade games
 Radeon R360 videocard
 Mazda R360 (1960–1966), a Japanese kei car
 R-360 Neptune, a Ukrainian anti-ship cruise missile
 R360 road (disambiguation)

See also

 List of highways numbered 360 (roads numbered 360)
 360 (disambiguation)
 R (disambiguation)